Santa Fe Foothills is an unincorporated community and census-designated place (CDP) in Santa Fe County, New Mexico, United States. It was first listed as a CDP prior to the 2020 census.

The CDP is in northern Santa Fe County and is bordered to the northwest by the city of Santa Fe, the state capital, to the west by Conejo, to the southwest by Sunlit Hills, to the southeast by Cañada de los Alamos, and to the northeast by Santa Fe National Forest.  The community is in the foothills of the southern end of the Sangre de Cristo Mountains.

Demographics

Education
It is within Santa Fe Public Schools.

References 

Census-designated places in Santa Fe County, New Mexico
Census-designated places in New Mexico